The naval Battle of Montevideo of 21 October 1823 formed a part of the Siege of Montevideo, as Brazilian forces sought to capture the last Portuguese redoubt in the Cisplatina during the War of Independence of Brazil. 

The battle was one of the few conventional naval battles between the two powers during the war. The Portuguese forces, a captured schooner and three armed transports, had endured the Brazilian blockade of the port but only sought to break it on 21 October. 

Despite heavy fighting neither side lost a ship, and the Portuguese withdrew to the port, with the conflict ending a month later with the surrender of Montevideo.

References

Naval battles involving Portugal
Conflicts in 1823
Naval battles of the Brazilian War of Independence
October 1823 events
1823 in Uruguay